was a town located in Kōka District, Shiga Prefecture, Japan. "Kōnan" means "southern Kōka".

As of 2004, the town has an estimated population of 20,118 and a density of 408.07 persons per km². The total area is 49.3 km².

On October 1, 2004, Kōnan, along with the towns of Kōka, Minakuchi, Shigaraki and Tsuchiyama (all from Kōka District), was merged to create the city of Kōka.

External links 

 Koka Sightseeing Guide

Dissolved municipalities of Shiga Prefecture
Kōka, Shiga